Willows is a rural locality in the Central Highlands Region, Queensland, Australia.

Geography 
The town of Bogantungan is within the west of the locality.

The town of Willows Gemfields is the centre of the locality.

The town of Withersfield is within the east of locality.

The Central Western railway enters the locality from the east (Anakie Siding/Lochington), passes through the town of Bogantungan, and exits to the west (Alpha). The locality is served by the following stations (from west to east): 

 Bogantungan railway station, serving the town of Bogantungan
 Kanoloo railway station, now abandoned
 Willows railway station
 Withersfield railway station, serving the former town of Withersfield

History 
In October 1880, 105 town lots were offered for sale in the Town of Withersfield.

Bogantungan State School opened on 19 March 1883. It closed on 11 August 1972. It was on Jackson Street.

Withersfield Provisional School opened circa 1886 but closed the same year. A new Withersfield State School opened in 1920. On Saturday 9 December 1922, the school burned down after a school picnic and dance evening the previous day. The school closed circa 1942. It was located north of the town of Withersfield on a  site at approx . Nothing remains of the town today.

Education 
There are no schools in Willows. The nearest government primary schools are Anakie State School in neighbouring Anakie Siding to the east, Lochington State School in neighbouring Lochington to the south, and Alpha State School in neighbouring Alpha to the west. The nearest government secondary schools are Alpha State School (to Year 10) and Emerald State High School (to Year 12) in Emerald to the east. However, these secondary schools may be too distant for daily commuting with distance education and boarding schools as other options.

References

External links 

 

Central Highlands Region
Localities in Queensland
Towns in Queensland